{{Infobox book
| italic title      = 'Serafina and the Black Cloak| name              =
| image             = File:Serafinaandtheblackcloak.png
| image_size        =
| border            =
| alt               =
| caption           = First edition
| author            = Robert Beatty
| audio_read_by     =
| title_orig        =
| orig_lang_code    =
| title_working     =
| translator        =
| illustrator       =
| cover_artist      = Maria Elias
| country           = United States
| language          =
| series            = Serafina Series (book 1)
| release_number    =
| subject           =
| genre             = Fantasy, Historical Fiction, Middle-Grade novel
| set_in            = Asheville, N.C 1899
| publisher         = Disney Hyperion
| publisher2        =
| pub_date          =
| english_pub_date  =
| published         = July 14th, 2015
| media_type        = Print (hardcover and paperback), audiobook, e-book
| pages             = 293
| awards            =
| isbn              = 9781484709016
| isbn_note         =
| oclc              = 1023815721
| dewey             =
| congress          = PZ7.1.B4347 Sh 2016
| preceded_by       =
| followed_by       = Serafina and the Twisted Staff
| native_wikisource =
| wikisource        =
| notes             =
| exclude_cover     =
| website           = robertbeattybooks
}}Serafina and the Black Cloak is a 2015 American historical fiction and fantasy novel written by Robert Beatty. It is the first novel in the Serafina Series and the prequel to Serafina and the Twisted Staff. This book follows the spooky adventures of twelve-year-old Serafina,  Chief Rat Catcher of the Biltmore Estate, as she works with friend Braeden Vanderbilt to uncover the true identity of The Man in the Black Cloak who is responsible for the mysterious disappearance of several of the estate's youngest guests. Serafina and the Black Cloak was released on July 14th, 2015, by Disney Hyperion and has been the recipient of numerous awards and nominations, including the 2016 Pat Conroy Southern Book Prize and the Goodreads #1 Middle Grade Novel of 2015. Serafina and the Black Cloak is followed by Serafina and the Twisted Staff, Serafina and the Splintered Heart, and Serafina and the Seven Stars''.

References

American children's novels
2015 American novels
American historical novels
Hyperion Books books